A mãe dos netos  is a 2008 Spanish film.

Synopsis 
A Mãe Dos Netos (The Grandchildren's Mother) is a story about AIDS in Mozambique and how it inexorably tears families apart, causing the parents’ death and leaving the elderly to care for the children. A combination of animation and documentary, this film narrates the story of Granny Elisa, whose son and eight wives died, leaving her to care for 14 children.

External links 

2008 films
Mozambican short films